Amasya University (Turkish: Amasya Üniversitesi) is a university located in Amasya, Turkey. It was established  on 17 March 2006.

History
The history of the university goes back to 1974, when a teacher training institution was established in Amasya by the Ministry of Education. In 1975, the Ministry of Education also founded a vocational school in Amasya.

In 1982 when the Higher Education Council was established, these two schools became units of Ondokuz Mayıs University in Samsun. In the 2011-2012 academic year, Amasya University educated students through five faculties, including Education, Sciences & Arts, Architecture, Technology and Medical; one health vocational school; five vocational schools (Amasya, Merzifon, Taşova, Suluova and Gümüşhacıköy); and two institutes (Sciences and Social Sciences).

Amasya University has limited international agreements compared to other universities. Number of agreements and international programmes have been increasing rapidly. The university has some international exchange programs such as Erasmus, Grundtvig, Leonardo and Comenius. Each year limited number of students go/come from/to foreign universities by these programmes. In additionally, Farabi programme is popular for the exchange of students domestically.

Academic Units

Faculties
 Faculty of Education
 Faculty of Science and Literature
 Faculty of Technology
 Faculty of Architecture
 Faculty of Medicine (cooperation with Samsun Ondokuz Mayıs University)
 Faculty of Economy and Management (not active yet)

Institutes
 Scientific Sciences Institute
 Social Sciences Institute

Junior College
 College of Health

Junior Technical College
 Amasya Junior Technical College
 Merzifon Junior Technical College
 Suluova Junior Technical College
 Gumushacikoy Junior Technical College
 Tasova Junior Technical College

Central Research Laboratory
It works depending on the university in the Campus of Ipekkoy.

References

External links
Official Website

Universities and colleges in Turkey
Educational institutions established in 2006
State universities and colleges in Turkey
Amasya
2006 establishments in Turkey